Gustav Lorentzen (28 September 1947 – 21 April 2010), also known by his stage name Ludvigsen, was a Norwegian singer-songwriter, best known from being half of the successful duo Knutsen & Ludvigsen, alongside Øystein "Knutsen" Dolmen. He went solo in 1986, winning four Spellemann awards and one nomination for his 5 albums.

In addition to music, Lorentzen made several TV series and books, mostly intended for children. He also had a degree in acoustics from the Norwegian Institute of Technology.

From 1997 until his death, Lorentzen collaborated with the psychologist Magne Raundalen, creating a therapeutic program for traumatized children, mainly victims of wars. He was also a UNICEF Ambassador since 1993.

On 21 April 2010, Lorentzen collapsed during an orienteering competition outside of Bergen and went into cardiac arrest. He was pronounced dead a few minutes later.

References

1947 births
2010 deaths
Norwegian male singers
Norwegian songwriters
Musicians from Bergen
Sport deaths in Norway
Norwegian multi-instrumentalists
Norwegian rock singers
UNICEF Goodwill Ambassadors